The Inverkip Rovers Open  tennis tournament was a grass court tennis event organized by the Inverkip Rovers Lawn Tennis Club that was staged annually on the Castle Wemyss courts at Castle Wemyss, Wemyss Bay, Wemyss Bay, Renfrewshire, Scotland. It ran from 1884 until 1905. The tournament featured two events the open itself and from 1890 the Castle Wemyss Cup.

History
Castle Wemyss was a large mansion in Wemyss Bay, Scotland. It stood on the southern shore of the Firth of Clyde at Wemyss Point, where the firth turns southwards. The Inverkip Rovers Open tennis tournament was first established in 1882 as the Iverkip Rovers LTC Tournament. In 1885 it became an open event and was organised by the Inverkip Rovers Lawn Tennis Club who staged the event annually on the Castle Wemyss Courts at Castle Wemyss, Wemyss Bay,  Renfrewshire, Scotland. The tournament featured two events the open itself and from 1890 the Castle Wemyss Cup. for men only. It was discontinued in 1905.

Finals

Men's Singles

Inverkip Rovers LTC Tournament
 1882– Horatio Renaud Babington Peile def. ?
 1883– George Arbuthnot Burns  def.  Horatio Renaud Babington Peile, 5–6, 3–6, 6–3, 6–5, 6-5 
 1884– Horatio Renaud Babington Peile  def.  D.M. Hannay, 3 sets to 2 
Inverkip Rovers Open
 1885– Charles Herbert Joshua Higginbotham  def. ?
 1886– Charles Herbert Joshua Higginbotham  def.  G.H. Aitken, 7–5, 6–4, 0–6, 6-4 
 1887 Archibald Thomson  def.  Henry Guy Nadin, w.o.

Castle Wemyss Cup
 1890– G. Scott-Jackson def.  Henry Guy Nadin, 6–4, 2–6, 6–4, 7-5 
 1891– Richard Millar Watson def.  Gerald William Peacocke, 6–3, 6–2, 6-4
 1892– Henry Guy Nadin def. ?
 1893– Gerald William Peacocke def.  Arthur Knox Cronin, 6–2, 6–4, 9-7 
 1894– Gerald William Peacocke def.  Henry Guy Nadin, 4–6, 10–8, 6–0, 6-3 
 1895– Kenneth Ramsden Marley def.  Gerald William Peacocke, 6–4, 7–5, 7-5  
 1898– Gerald William Peacocke def.  George Lawrence Orme, w.o.
 1899– Gerald William Peacocke def.  James Anthony Traill, 6–2, 6–3, 5–7, 6-3
 1905–  Reginald Doherty def.  James Anthony Traill, 6–1, 6–1, 6-2

Mens Doubles
Inverkip Rovers Open
 1886– Charles Herbert Joshua Higginbotham /[ D.M. Hannay def.  Walter Robert Baines Latham/T.F. Donald,  5-6 3-6 6-3 6-5 6-4

Mixed Doubles
Inverkip Rovers Open
 1886– G.H. Aitken/ Miss Macquisten def.  D.M. Hannay/ Mrs Macquisten, 3-6 6-3 6-3

References

Grass court tennis tournaments
Defunct tennis tournaments in the United Kingdom